Florent Serra was the defending champion, but was eliminated in the round robin competition.

Novak Djokovic won the title, defeating Chris Guccione 6–3, 6–7(6–8), 6–4 in the final.

Seeds

 Novak Djokovic (champion)
 Richard Gasquet (quarterfinals)
 Radek Štěpánek (round robin)
 Lleyton Hewitt (round robin)
 Dominik Hrbatý (round robin)
 Arnaud Clément (round robin)
 Gilles Simon (round robin)
 Paul-Henri Mathieu (round robin)

Draw

Finals

Round robin

Elimination round
Prior to the round robin and after the completion of the qualifying draws, the 16 players with the lowest tier in the tournament (4 qualifiers, 3 wild cards and 9 based on ATP rankings) competed in the elimination round in order to get one of the 8 last spots into the round robin competition. Winners in this round entered as main entrants.

RR-LL: Vassallo Argüello entered the round robin competition as lucky loser.

Qualifying

Seeds

 Wesley Moodie (qualified)
 Rik de Voest (qualifying competition)
 Ernests Gulbis (qualifying competition)
 Wang Yeu-Tzuoo (first round)
 Mischa Zverev (first round)
 Wayne Arthurs (first round)
 Nathan Healey (qualified)
 Go Soeda (qualified)

Qualifiers

Qualifying draw

First qualifier

Second qualifier

Third qualifier

Fourth qualifier

External links
 Main draw
 Qualifying draw

Singles